Northwest Expressway may refer to:

Northwest Expressway (Boston), a section of US 3
Northwest Expressway (Oklahoma City), a section of SH-3
Northwest Expressway (Baltimore), Maryland, also known as I-795
Northwest Expressway (Eugene, Oregon)
Kennedy Expressway in Chicago, formerly known as the Northwest Expressway